Abdulrahman Al-Barakah is a Saudi Arabian professional football player who currently plays as a midfielder for Abha.

Career
On 23 January 2013, Al-Barakah joined Al-Shoalah on loan from Al-Shabab .

References

External links
Eurosport.fr Profile 

Goal.com Profile
Hailoo Sport Profile
slstat.com Profile

1990 births
Living people
Saudi Arabian footballers
Al-Shabab FC (Riyadh) players
Al-Shoulla FC players
Al-Raed FC players
Al-Taawoun FC players
Al-Fayha FC players
Abha Club players
Saudi Professional League players
Association football midfielders